Odintsovo is a city and the administrative center of Odintsovsky District in Moscow Oblast, Russia. Western suburb of Moscow. Population:

History
The village of Odintsovo was established in the late 14th century by a noble known as Andrey Odinets (whose real name Andrey Domotkanov). For the great service to Dmitry Donskoy Odinets was granted land to the southwest of Moscow. Town status was granted to Odintsovo in 1957.

Administrative and municipal status
Within the framework of administrative divisions, Odintsovo serves as the administrative center of Odintsovsky District. As an administrative division, it is, together with nineteen rural localities, incorporated within Odintsovsky District as the City of Odintsovo. As a municipal division, the City of Odintsovo is incorporated within Odintsovsky Municipal District as Odintsovo Urban Settlement.

Coat of arms
The coat of arms of Odintsovo shows a white deer, representing cleanliness and purity. The deer lies facing the west, although gazes to the east.

Sports
Odintsovo volleyball clubs Iskra (men) and Zarechie Odintsovo (women) were both champions of Russia in the past and are still performing successfully. Zarechie Odintsovo won in the final in April 2008 against Dinamo Moscow to become champions of Russia. Many male and female players in Russian national volleyball teams either grew up, or played/trained in Odintsovo.

"The Ice Palace", or the Odintsovo ice skating and hockey ring, was named to have "the best ice ever played on" by North American and former Soviet ice hockey veterans during the Stanley Cup visit in 2004.

Religion

Odintsovo is home to the Church of Grebnevskaya, Icon of the Mother of God, which was built in 1802.

Notable people
Olga Budina (born 1975), theater and film actress
Ivan Dubasov (1897–1988), artist active in the Soviet Union
Konstantin Krizhevsky (1926-2000), footballer
Larisa Lazutina (born 1965), Olympic, Russian, and World Cross-country skiing champion

Twin towns – sister cities

Odintsovo is twinned with:

Kruševac, Serbia
Novopolotsk, Belarus
Wittmund, Germany

Partners
Kizlyar, Russia
Sudzhansky District, Russia

References

Notes

Sources

Cities and towns in Moscow Oblast
Odintsovsky District